The Chalky, Big Green and Badger Island Groups Important Bird Area lies in eastern Bass Strait west of Flinders in the Furneaux Group of Tasmania, Australia.  Its component islands collectively form a 21 km2 Important Bird Area (IBA) which supports more than 1% of the global populations of the Cape Barren goose, black-faced cormorant, little penguin, white-faced storm-petrel, short-tailed shearwater, Pacific gull, and sooty oystercatcher.  It also supports significant numbers of fairy terns.

The islands include:
Chalky Island Group
 Chalky Island
 Little Chalky Island
 Isabella Island
 Mile Island

Big Green Island Group
 Big Green Island
 East Kangaroo Island

Badger Island Group
 Badger Island
 Little Badger Island
 Mount Chappell Island
 North West Mount Chappell Islet
 Goose Island
 Little Goose Island
 Inner Little Goose Island
 Beagle Island

References

Important Bird Areas of Tasmania
Furneaux Group